John McNicol (22 August 1863 – 7 July 1933) was a Scottish footballer who played for Vale of Leven and Dumbarton.

His younger brother Duncan McNicol was also a footballer.

References

1863 births
Scottish footballers
Dumbarton F.C. players
1933 deaths
Place of death missing
Scottish Football League players
Vale of Leven F.C. players
Association football wing halves